A mether is a communal or 'Friendship' drinking vessel from the Celtic tradition, mainly in Ireland and originally solely for mead with old examples being made of wood although they might have silver ornamentation added at a later date. The name 'Mether' is said to be derived from 'meth' that is the old name for mead as in the Welsh for mead that is 'medd', and the word 'metheglin' derived from the compound word 'meddyglyn', 'healing liquor'. Examples of wooden methers have been recovered from Irish peat bogs. Another possibility is that the name may come from the Irish Gaelic “Mehill” meaning a 'gathering'.

The best known ancient Mether in Scotland is the Dunvegan Cup, which is a 10th-century wooden example provided with silver ornamentation in the 15th century. Probably Irish in origin but Belonging to the Clan MacLeod, the Dunvegan mether is held in the clan collection of artifacts at Dunvegan Castle.

Characteristics
Usually made of woods such as crab apple, alder, willow, sycamore, etc. with a four side top and oval or circular bottom. Methers have a number of handles, placed at the foot of the vessel and sometimes extending below the handle bottom to form feet as well as serving as handles. The actual number of these handles varies from one to four and the vessel itself varies from 6 to 12 inches (15 cm to 30 cm) in height with a capacity of from one to three pints. The multiple handles would make it easier to pass from one person to the next.

Use
Visitors were formally welcomed in 'peace and friendship' with a mether and the guest would pass the cup only to his right (sun-wise) for luck. The cup would be held in both hands. Intended also for the communal drinking and drinking bouts by the common people the mether is designed to be used by drinking from one of the four broad corners and if a drink is taken in haste the mead will flow onto the person concerned with humorous consequences adding to the festive air on the occasions of rural tasks such as funerals, weddings, fairs, sowing, haymaking, reaping, threshing, thatching, etc.

Methers were also used for drinking other fluids such as milk, buttermilk, etc.

Methers

Small typical mether cups made from silver, not exceeding 3" in height (7.5 cm) and often with three to four handles were produced by silversmiths in the 18th and 20th centuries as presentation, such as the Sigerson Cup for Gaelic Football; the Liam MacCarthy Cup and Dr Harty Cup for Hurling; and christening cups. Pottery examples exist, such as examples of Hedingham-ware with four feet around 6 inches high.

Mention in legend

King Tuathal in the 2nd Century A.D. had seen a Roman drinking vessels with handles and decided to introduce this style to Ireland. The King instructed his smith as to what he wanted. Upon completing his task the smith held the cup by the handle so the king could not grasp the cup except by cupping it as he would normally. The smith was asked to add a second handle to overcome this but he now held the cup by both handles and the king was still left with no handle by which to take hold of the cup. A third handle was the solution but the smith now presented the vessel to Tuathal by holding the cup by two handles, the third pointing towards himself. A fourth handle was duly added, the final solution found and the mether born.

The mether is mentioned in The Fate of the Children of Lir (14th century), when Fionnuala laments "There is our food and our wine, they are The white sand and bitter brine; — [Yet] often drank we hazel mead. From round cups with four lips." (original Middle Irish: chuachán cruinn cheithre g-cearn)

Micro-history
The library of the Royal Irish Academy holds a translation of The Hospitality of the House of Two Methers an Irish tale said to have been a favourite of St Patrick and part of the oral folklore of his day.

Methers can be found in a number of private collections and museums, sometimes decorated and once hereditary treasures of famous Celtic families.

References
Notes

Sources

 Gayre, G. R. (1948). Wassail! In Mazers of Mead. London : Phillimore.

External links
Video and narration on Celtic Methers
A 1904 Silver Mether

Drinkware